Hanna Haponova (in statistics also Ganna Gaponova, ; born 28 October 1985) is a Ukrainian table tennis player who has competed at the 2020 Summer Olympics where she was relegated in the Round 1 by Austrian Liu Jia.

Haponova won bronze medal in team competition at the 2015 European Championships (in team with Margaryta Pesotska and Tetyana Bilenko) and another bronze in doubles competition at the 2020 European Championships (together with Bilenko) which was Ukraine's first continental medal in women's doubles.

References

External links
 

1985 births
Living people
Ukrainian female table tennis players
Table tennis players at the 2020 Summer Olympics
Olympic table tennis players of Ukraine
Sportspeople from Kharkiv
European Games competitors for Ukraine
Table tennis players at the 2019 European Games
21st-century Ukrainian women